This is a list of Rijksmonuments in Noordoostpolder.

Emmeloord

Ens

Kraggenburg

Luttelgeest

Marknesse

Nagele

Rutten

Noordoostpolder
Noordoostpolder